Massimo Storgato (born 3 June 1961, in Turin) is an Italian professional football coach and a former player, who played as a defender.

Honours
Juventus
 Serie A champion: 1980–81.
 Coppa Italia winner: 1982–83.

External links

1961 births
Living people
Italian footballers
Serie A players
Serie B players
Serie C players
Juventus F.C. players
Atalanta B.C. players
A.C. Cesena players
Hellas Verona F.C. players
S.S. Lazio players
Udinese Calcio players
U.S. Avellino 1912 players
Cosenza Calcio 1914 players
U.S. Alessandria Calcio 1912 players
F.C. Pro Vercelli 1892 players
Italian football managers
Association football defenders